Derive may refer to:

Derive (computer algebra system), a commercial system made by Texas Instruments
Dérive (magazine), an Austrian science magazine on urbanism
Dérive, a psychogeographical concept

See also

Derivation (disambiguation)
Derivative (disambiguation)